Vijayamangalam Jain temple also known as Chandrapraba Tirtankarar Temple is a Jain temple in the town of Vijayamangalam in Erode district, Tamil Nadu.

History 

Vijayamangalam was historically part of Kongu Nadu. This town was an ancient settlement of Jains. King Konguvelir composed an epic Pancha-Kaviyams here. Tamil Sangam (assembly of Tamil scholars and poets) was organised here when Konguvelir composed Perunkathai. During the sangam King's maid helped him to answer the questions of scholarly Sangam. To commemorate this event the idols of King Konguvelir, his maid and the members of the Tamil Sangam were installed inside the temple.

There is an inscription inside the temple that talks of the beauty of Perunkathai. The Vijayamangalam village is also the birthplace of a 12th century Jain acharya Bhavanadi, who authored Nannūl, a work on Tamil grammar. This temple is the oldest Jain temple in the Kongu Nadu region.

The sister of Chavundaraya (a minister during the reign of Western Ganga dynasty), Pullava committed sallekhana or fasting to death here.

About temple 

This temple is dedicated to Chandraprabha, the eighth Tirthankara of Jainism. The temple follows Western Ganga architecture with brick Vimana facing south and ardhamandapa housing idols of Pañca-Parameṣṭhi. The temple is enclosed within a prakaram entered through a gopuram. Many Jain idols dating back to uncertain times having reported in Vijayamangalam. 

The temple is maintained and protected by the Archaeological Survey of India.

Photo gallery

See also 
 Trilokyanatha Temple
 Nannūl
 Cīvaka Cintāmaṇi

References

Citation

Sources

Book

Web

External links 
 

Jain temples in Tamil Nadu
7th-century Jain temples
Erode district